Elapognathus is a genus of snakes of the family Elapidae.

Species
 Elapognathus coronatus (Schlegel, 1837)
 Elapognathus minor (Günther, 1863)

References

 
Snake genera
Taxa named by George Albert Boulenger
Taxonomy articles created by Polbot